Aleksey Svirin (born 15 December 1978 in Moscow) is a Russian rower. He won a gold medal at the 2004 Summer Olympics in the men's quadruple sculls, with Igor Kravtsov, Sergey Fedorovtsev and Nikolay Spinyov.  He also competed at the 2008 and 2012 Summer Olympics.

At European level, he is a two-time European champion, also in the quadruple sculls.

References

External links 
 
 

1978 births
Russian male rowers
Rowers at the 2004 Summer Olympics
Rowers at the 2008 Summer Olympics
Rowers at the 2012 Summer Olympics
Olympic rowers of Russia
Medalists at the 2004 Summer Olympics
Olympic medalists in rowing
Olympic gold medalists for Russia
Rowers from Moscow
Living people
European Rowing Championships medalists